Heights Christian Church is a historic church at 1703 Heights Boulevard in the Houston Heights section of Houston, Texas.

It was built in 1927. In 1967 the congregation moved to a new location, but retained ownership of the building which was used for community events. The building was added to the National Register of Historic Places in 1983. It is now known as Lambert Hall and is used for community events, including operas.

References

External links

Churches in Houston
Churches on the National Register of Historic Places in Texas
Churches completed in 1927
20th-century churches in the United States
Churches in Harris County, Texas
1927 establishments in Texas
National Register of Historic Places in Houston